Pan Yao (born 1989-03-27 in Sanhe Farm, Xuyi county, Jiangsu) is a Chinese male sprint canoeist who competed in the late 2000s. At the 2008 Summer Olympics in Beijing, he was eliminated in the semifinals of both the K-1 500 m and the K-1 1000 m events.

Competing in the Guangzhou Asian Games, 2010, Pan won the silver medalist at K-1 1000 m, 4th at K-4 1000 m. His personal best was that he won the champion at k-2 1000 m in 2007 China Water Sports Games, held in Rizhao Water Sports Base.

References

Sports-Reference.com profile

1989 births
Living people
Sportspeople from Huai'an
Olympic canoeists of China
Canoeists at the 2008 Summer Olympics
Asian Games medalists in canoeing
Canoeists at the 2010 Asian Games
Chinese male canoeists
Medalists at the 2010 Asian Games
Asian Games silver medalists for China